Alexander Gilmore Cattell (February 12, 1816April 8, 1894) was a United States senator from New Jersey.

Biography

Early life
Born in Salem, New Jersey, Cattell received an academic education, and engaged in mercantile pursuits in Salem until 1846.

Early career
Cattell was elected to the New Jersey General Assembly in 1840, and served as clerk from 1842-1844. He was a member of the State constitutional convention in 1844 and moved to Philadelphia in 1846, where he engaged in business and banking. He was a member of the Philadelphia Common Council from 1848 to 1854, organized the Corn Exchange Bank, and was its president from 1858 to 1871.

Congress
In 1863, Cattell moved to Merchantville, New Jersey in 1863 and was elected as a Republican to the U.S. Senate to succeed John P. Stockton, whose seat was declared vacant, and served from September 19, 1866, to March 3, 1871. He was not a candidate for reelection. While in the Senate, he was chairman of the Joint Committee on the Library for the Forty-first Congress.

Later life
Cattell was appointed by President Ulysses Grant to be a member of the first United States Civil Service Commission and served two years, resigning to accept the position of United States financial agent in London, serving in 1873 and 1874. He was a member of New Jersey Board of Tax Assessors from 1884 to 1891, and was its president from 1889 to 1891. In 1891, he was appointed a member of the State board of education for a term of three years.

Cattell died in Jamestown, New York in 1894 and was interred in Colestown Cemetery in Cherry Hill Township, near Merchantville. He had five brothers and two sisters, his one brother, William Cassady Cattell, served as the sixth president of Lafayette College.

See also
Grant administration scandals#Cattellism

References

External links

Political Graveyard: Alexander G. Cattell

1816 births
1894 deaths
Republican Party members of the New Jersey General Assembly
People from Merchantville, New Jersey
People from Salem, New Jersey
Republican Party United States senators from New Jersey
Philadelphia City Council members
19th-century American politicians
Burials at Colestown Cemetery (Cherry Hill, New Jersey)